Russell Ferguson is an American Krump dancer from Boston, Massachusetts. He won So You Think You Can Dance season 6, making him the first Krumper to win the title.
Russell is a graduate of the Boston Arts Academy and attended the University of the Arts in Philadelphia as a dance major.

So You Think You Can Dance

Russell competed on season 6 of the FOX reality dance competition, So You Think You Can Dance.  His partner for weeks 1-5 was Noelle Marsh.  However, before taping began, Noelle was injured and unable to dance, so during the taping of week 1, Russell danced with their choreographer, Melanie LaPatin. In week 6 he danced with Mollee Gray. His partner for week 7 was to be Ashleigh Di Lello, but due to injury, she was unable to dance during the show's taping. As the first Krumper to make it to Vegas, into the Top 20, Top 10 and Finale, Russell went on to win the competition. Unfortunately, he was injured during the finale and was unable to perform his remaining routines.

After So You Think You Can Dance

Russell was a cast member of the 2013 Anthony William's Urban Nutcracker  in Boston, MA. Ferguson will appear in the popular prologue that features a face-off between two different genres of dance and will also appear in dance scenes as the Soldier Doll and Caviar Caper. In 2014, he judged an episode of So You Think You Can Dance, China.

References

American male dancers
So You Think You Can Dance winners
Living people
African-American male dancers
African-American dancers
So You Think You Can Dance (American TV series) contestants
21st-century American dancers
Year of birth missing (living people)
21st-century African-American people